is a passenger railway station located in the city of Sennan, Osaka Prefecture, Japan, operated by the private railway operator Nankai Electric Railway. It has the station number "NK35".

Lines

Layout
The station consists of two opposed side platforms connected by a level crossing.

Platforms

Adjacent stations

History
Okadaura Station opened on 1 November 1915.

Passenger statistics
In fiscal 2019, the station was used by an average of 2478 passengers daily.

Surrounding area
 Nishishindachi Elementary School
 Nishishindachi Junior High School
 Nishishindachi Post Office

See also
 List of railway stations in Japan

References

External links

  

Railway stations in Japan opened in 1915
Railway stations in Osaka Prefecture
Sennan, Osaka